Hatadou Sako  (born 21 October 1995) is a Senegalese/French female handball player for Metz Handball and the Senegalese national team.

She was part of the team at the 2019 World Women's Handball Championship.

Achievements
Championnat de France:
Silver Medalist: 2019

Individual awards
French Championship Best Goalkeeper: 2019

References

External links

1995 births
Living people
Senegalese female handball players
People from Tournan-en-Brie
Competitors at the 2015 African Games
African Games bronze medalists for Senegal
African Games medalists in handball
Sportspeople from Seine-et-Marne
French female handball players
Black French sportspeople
French sportspeople of Senegalese descent